Kelan may refer to:

Kelan County, Shanxi Province, China
Kelan River, Xinjiang, China
Elisabeth Kelan, scholar on gender relations in organisations
Kolanı (disambiguation), several places in Azerbaijan

See also 
 Kellan, a given name
 Kelen (disambiguation)